Krëban or Krëbans may refer to:

Krëbans (Kashubian: Krëbanë), an ethnic subgroup of Kashubians 
Krëbane ("Krebans"), a Kashubian folkloric ensemble and a socio-cultural association with the same name
 Krëban z Milachòwa, pen name of Stanisław Pestka